Okpuala Ngwa is a town in Isiala-Ngwa North. It serves as the administrative headquarters for the local government.
It was the first settlement and headquarters of the Ngwa people. The people of Okpuala Ngwa speak the Ngwa dialect of the Ngwa people.

References 

Populated places in Abia State
Villages in Igboland